Javon Walton is an American actor  and boxer best known for his portrayal of Ashtray in the HBO series Euphoria. After his work in Euphoria, he began working on the television series Utopia, The Umbrella Academy, and the film Samaritan.

Career
In June 2019, Javon Walton appeared in the HBO television series Euphoria as Ashtray, before landing a main role in the Amazon Prime Video streaming series Utopia (2020) as Grant Bishop. In 2021, he appeared in the animated comedy horror film The Addams Family 2 as Pugsley Addams. In 2022, he starred in the Netflix superhero television series The Umbrella Academy, and in the superhero thriller film Samaritan as Sam Cleary.

Filmography

References

External links
 

21st-century American male actors
American male television actors
American male child actors
Living people
Place of birth missing (living people)
Year of birth missing (living people)